

Winners and nominees

1980s

1990s

2000s

2010s

2020s

Records 
 Most awarded directors: Miguel Córcega and Mónica Miguel, 6 times
 Directors that won every nomination: Raúl Araiza and Luis Vélez, 2 times.
 Most nominated director: Miguel Córcega with 9 nominations.
 Most nominated directors without a win: Sergio Cataño with 4 nominations.
 Youngest winner: Claudio Reyes Rubio, 30 years old.
 Youngest nominee: Claudio Reyes Rubio, 36 years old.
 Oldest winner: Miguel Córcega, 78 years old.
 Oldest nominee: Jorge Fons, 76 years old.
 Directors winning after short time:
Benjamín Cann and Rodrigo Zaunbos by (Por Ella Soy Eva, 2013) and (Mentir para vivir, 2014), 2 consecutive years.
Eric Morales and Juan Pablo Blanco by (La candidata, 2017) and (Caer en tentación, 2018), 2 consecutive years.
 Directors winning after long time: Mónica Miguel by (De frente al sol, 1993) and (El manantial, 2002), 9 years difference.

References

External links 
TVyNovelas at esmas.com
TVyNovelas Awards at the univision.com

Direction
Direction
Direction